The 1957 Australian Grand Prix was a Formula Libre motor race held at Caversham Circuit, Western Australia on 4 March 1957. The race had 24 starters.

It was the twenty second Australian Grand Prix.  Lex Davison won his second AGP a victory he shared after using Bill Patterson as a relief driver. The extreme heat of the Western Australian summer saw several teams use two drivers over the 245 kilometre race distance.

The race was also the first ever round of an Australian Drivers' Championship, which was held for the first time in 1957.

Classification 

Results as follows.

References

Grand Prix
Australian Grand Prix
Australian Grand Prix